James "Jim" Specht is an American agronomist, focusing in soybean genetics and physiology and agronomics of soybean response of water, currently Emeritus Professor and formerly the Francis & Dorothy Haskins and Charles E. Bessey Professor of Agronomy and Horticulture at University of Nebraska and an Elected Fellow of the American Association for the Advancement of Science and American Society of Agronomy.

References

University of Nebraska faculty
American agronomists
University of Nebraska alumni
Living people
Year of birth missing (living people)
Place of birth missing (living people)
Fellows of the American Association for the Advancement of Science